KATCOM, or in full Korean Augmentation to Commonwealth Division or Korean Augmentation Troops to Commonwealth Division or Korean Attached Commonwealth Division, refers to significant numbers of South Korean soldiers who, during the Korean War, were attached to the 1st Commonwealth Division, similar to the KATUSA system in the US Army. 

The system took effect from May 1952. South Korean troops were included within Commonwealth units as replacements simply to make up numbers during periods of troop rotation. Soldiers assigned as KATCOMs were given 16 weeks' standard basic training at the ROK Replacement Training Center with further specialist training on British and Canadian weaponry. On average, each British battalion received 94 South Korean soldiers, making a total of 1,000 South Koreans across the whole Commonwealth division.

More broadly, KATCOM can also refer to South Korean troops serving in other UN contingents, notably the Belgian and Dutch contingents.

See also
KATUSA
1st Commonwealth Division

References

External links

영(英)군복 입고 싸운 '카트콤' 아시나요

British Commonwealth units and formations
Military units and formations of the Korean War
Expatriate military units and formations
South Korea–United Kingdom relations